Yui Fukuta (born 20 May 1998) is a Japanese professional footballer who plays as a midfielder for WE League club MyNavi Sendai.

Club career 
Fukuta made her WE League debut on 18 September 2021.

References 

Living people
1998 births
Women's association football midfielders
WE League players
Japanese women's footballers
Association football people from Aichi Prefecture
Mynavi Vegalta Sendai Ladies players